Axel Hoffmann is an electrical engineer at the Argonne National Laboratory in Argonne, Illinois. He was named a Fellow of the Institute of Electrical and Electronics Engineers (IEEE) in 2014 for his contributions to nanomagnetism and manipulation of spin current.

References

Fellow Members of the IEEE
Living people
Year of birth missing (living people)
Place of birth missing (living people)
Argonne National Laboratory people
Fellows of the American Physical Society
American electrical engineers